is Japanese idol girl group AKB48's 19th single, released on December 8, 2010.

Member selection
Following AKB48's July concerts at Yoyogi National Gymnasium in Tokyo, it was announced that the headlining "senbatsu" members for the 19th single would be decided in a janken (rock paper scissors) tournament among AKB48 members and four representatives of AKB48 trainees (also known as research students or kenkyuusei) also decided by janken. The tournament was a bracketed, single knockout format with 51 members. The top 16 were given senbatsu status and participated in the single, 12 of which would be given media senbatsu members (which means that these 12 would appear on TV shows and other media promoting the single). The tournament was held at Nippon Budokan on September 21, and was won by Team K's Mayumi Uchida, who was given the center headlining position.

Release
"Chance no Junban" was released in four different versions and cover variations, with the theater version being exclusively sold in the AKB48 theater in Akihabara, Tokyo. Versions A, K, and B contained a different third track aside from the title track and "Yoyaku shita Christmas", which was performed by one of the respective teams of AKB48. The theater version included a third track that was performed by Team Research Students. In addition to including their respective music videos, versions A, K, and B also included footages of the janken tournament that took place in Budokan in September. All first press releases was enclosed with a handshaking event ticket, to be redeemed later in national handshaking tours held across Japan in promotion of the single release.

Reception
"Chance no Junban" only sold 471,242 copies in its first day, placing it on top of the Oricon daily chart, and sold 54,780 more on the second day. The single has been certified triple platinum by the RIAJ for physical sales.

All succeeding singles after Chance no Junban sold 1 million copies in their first week of release, starting the AKB48 Million Streak, which lasted until the 42nd single, Kuchibiru ni Be My Baby.

Track listing

Contributing members

Chance no Junban
(Bold indicates front members who appears on the cover of theater version of the single, number in brackets denotes final placements in the Janken Tournament)
Team A: Asuka Kuramochi (10th), Haruna Kojima (3rd), Aki Takajō (8th), Haruka Nakagawa (4th), Atsuko Maeda (15th), Ami Maeda (5th)
Team K: Mayumi Uchida (1st), Miku Tanabe (12th), Tomomi Nakatsuka (9th), Sakiko Matsui (14th)
Team B: Haruka Ishida (2nd), Tomomi Kasai (13th), Kana Kobayashi (11th), Sumire Sato (6th), Natsuki Sato (7th), Rina Chikano (16th)

Only 4 senbatsu members who appear in this single have appeared in the senbatsu lineup for the last single, Beginner (Haruna Kojima, Takajo, Atsuko Maeda, Kasai). Nakagawa made her return to senbatsu since last making it in Heavy Rotation. Kuramochi has not appeared in senbatsu since Iiwake Maybe, the 13th single. Kana Kobayashi and Natsuki Sato both reappeared in senbatsu after an absence of 3 years and 8 months (since the 3rd single, Keibetsu Shiteita Aijō). Finally, other members such as Uchida, Ami Maeda, Tanabe, Nakatsuka, Sakiko Matsui, Ishida, Sumire Sato, and Chikano are making their first senbatsu appearance in an AKB48 single.

Yoyaku shita Christmas
Team A: Haruna Kojima, Rino Sashihara, Mariko Shinoda, Aki Takajo, Minami Takahashi, Atsuko Maeda, Ami Maeda
Team K: Tomomi Itano, Yuko Oshima, Minami Minegishi, Sae Miyazawa
Team B: Tomomi Kasai, Yuki Kashiwagi, Rie Kitahara, Mika Komori, Mayu Watanabe

Kurumi to Dialogue
Performed by Team A
(Bold indicates center member)
Team A: Misaki Iwasa, Aika Ota,  Shizuka Oya, Haruka Katayama, Kuramochi Asuka, Haruna Kojima, Rino Sashihara, Mariko Shinoda, Aki Takajo, Takahashi, Nakagawa, Chisato Nakata, Sayaka Nakaya, Atsuko Maeda, Ami Maeda, Natsumi Matsubara

Alive
Performed by Team K
(Bold indicates center members)
Team K: Sayaka Akimoto, Tomomi Itano, Uchida, Ayaka Umeda, Yuko Oshima, Ayaka Kikuchi, Miku Tanabe, Tomomi Nakatsuka, Moeno Nito, Misato Nonaka, Reina Fujie, Sakiko Matsui, Minami Minegishi, Sae Miyazawa, Yui Yokoyama, Rumi Yonezawa

Love Jump
Performed by Team B
(Bold indicates center members)
Team B: Haruka Ishida, Manami Oku, Tomomi Kasai, Yuki Kashiwagi, Rie Kitahara, Kana Kobayashi, Mika Komori, Amina Sato, Sumire Sato, Natsuki Sato, Mariya Suzuki, Rina Chikano, Natsumi Hirajima, Yuka Masuda, Miho Miyazaki, Mayu Watanabe

Fruit Snow
Performed by Kenkyusei
Team Research Students: Miori Ichikawa, Anna Iriyama, Mina Oba, Rena Kato, Yuki Kanazawa, Haruka Shimazaki, Haruka Shimada, Shihori Suzuki, Miyu Takeuchi, Mariya Nagao, Shiori Nakamata, Mariko Nakamura, Wakana Natori, Anna Mori, Suzuran Yamauchi, Nau Yamaguchi

Charts

Notes

References

2010 singles
AKB48 songs
Songs with lyrics by Yasushi Akimoto
Oricon Weekly number-one singles
Billboard Japan Hot 100 number-one singles
King Records (Japan) singles
2010 songs